Brigitte Elisabeth Holzapfel (born 10 April 1958 in Krefeld) is a retired West German high jumper.

At the 1975 European Junior Championships she won a bronze medal in the high jump and a gold medal in pentathlon. She finished eleventh at the 1976 Olympic Games, won silver medals at the 1977 and 1978 European Indoor Championships, and the bronze medal at the 1978 European Championships, finished sixth at the 1984 European Indoor Championships and eleventh at the 1984 Olympic Games. She represented the sports clubs TSV Preußen Krefeld, TuS 04 Leverkusen, LG Bayer Leverkusen and TV Wattenscheid, and became West German champion in 1976 and 1978.

Her personal best jump was 1.95 metres, achieved in August 1978 in Köln. This was the West German record.

International competitions

References

1958 births
Living people
West German female high jumpers
Athletes (track and field) at the 1976 Summer Olympics
Athletes (track and field) at the 1984 Summer Olympics
Olympic athletes of West Germany
Sportspeople from Krefeld
European Athletics Championships medalists